More plains, originally called Kiang Chu Thang in the local language, is a plateau on the Leh–Manali Highway. Kiang Chu Thang means a plain where the kiang (Tibetan wild ass) does not find water. It occupies 40 km of the highway between Leh and Pang. The plateau has an average elevation of 4,800 metres. The road is flanked by beautiful mountains on both sides. At some places, it runs along the Sumkhel Lungpa River, featuring stunning sand and rock natural formations.

 
 
 
 
   

The plain area starts after covering around 4 km uphill road from Pang towards Tanglang La pass. The road is mostly on the plain for approximately 35 km, before it again starts to rise to Tanglang La. This area is a major attraction to bikers heading towards Leh from Manali. The Border Roads Organisation (BRO) of Indian Army has converted the road to two lanes, one in each direction.

The area is without any population or development.

See also
Ladakh

References

Geography of Ladakh